Karma (Japanese: カルマ) is the first demo tape by Japanese rock band Fanatic Crisis. It was released independently on April, 1994. Kuroi Taiyou was later redone for their first indie album, Taiyou no Toriko, and the song Mobius to Aishou was later remade for the Cry-Max Pleasure compilation.

Track listing

Personnel 
Tsutomu Ishizuki − vocals, drums
Kazuya − guitar
Ryuji − bass

References

Fanatic Crisis albums
1994 albums
Demo albums